The MV S Venus is a freighter of Panamanian registry, attacked by Somali pirates on January 1, 2009.  It was successfully defended by defensive actions by members of Anti Piracy Maritime Security Solutions who used paint thinner, Molotov cocktails and a flare gun to set the attacking vessel ablaze.
After receiving a distress call from the freighter, French naval frigate  headed for the rescue. However, before the frigate's arrival, the pirates ceased their attack.
designated by the crew of the ship as the skiffs for assault pirates. The special force of the French navy ordered two skiffs carrying eight Somalis to stop. A visit on board the boat found six AK-47 assault rifles, one rocket-propelled grenade rocket launcher, ammunition, a grappling hook and two boarding ladders, and a GPS (Global Position System) among others, which were confiscated by the navy. The eight Somalis suspected of piracy were taken into custody by the French frigate to be handed over to the authorities in that country.

References

Piracy in Somalia
Cargo ships of Panama
Maritime incidents in 2009
Gulf of Aden
Action of 2009
1983 ships
Bulk carriers